Colours is the second studio album by Mark de Jong and Norman Lenden as Mark Norman under Magik Muzik, a sub-label from Black Hole Recordings. All tracks with the exception of "Talk Like a Stranger" and "One Moon Circling" were produced and composed by Mark Norman  To celebrate the release of the album, Mark Norman's management Global Twist Music prepared a world tour, supported by V Media Creative.

Track listing 

Note: The Digital Edition contains two bonus tracks.

Credits 
 Composer(s), Producer(s), Writer(s): Mark de Jong & Norman Lenden
 Artwork and Design By: Jeroen Vos
 Mastered By: Pieter De Wagter
 Photography: Rick van der Wal

Publishers 
 "Colour My Eyes" and "Be With U" are published by D.Y.M. Music / Melpar
 "Talk Like A Stranger" are published by Tazigirl Music (ASCAP) / Deepsky Music
 "One Moon Circling" are published by Tazigirl Music (ASCAP) / Zen Art Music
 Other tracks are published by Young Star Music Publishing / N. Star Publishing / Musicallstars

Personnel 
 "Colour My Eyes"
 Additional Bass and Guitar By: Steven Breukel
 Vocal Producer: Lucien Foort
 Vocals By: Celine Frewer
 Written and Composed By: Celine Frewer & Lucien Foort
 "Talk Like A Stranger"
 Written and Composed By: Jason Blum, Jes Brieden & Jesse Scott Giaquinta
 "Be With U"
 Vocal Producer: Lucien Foort
 Vocals By: Celine Frewer
 Written and Composed By: Celine Frewer & Lucien Foort
 "One Moon Circling"
 Vocal Producer: Jes Brieden
 Vocals By: Jes Brieden
 Additional Producer: Mike Olsen
 Written and Composed By: Jes Brieden & Mike Olsen

References 

2007 albums